The 1961 Australian Grand Prix was a Formula Libre motor race held at the newly completed Mallala Race Circuit in South Australia on 9 October 1961.  The race, which was Round 5 of the 1961 Australian Drivers' Championship, had 17 starters.

The race was the twenty sixth Australian Grand Prix and would be the last to be held in South Australia until the first Formula One World Championship Australian Grand Prix was staged at the new Adelaide Parklands Circuit in 1985. Lex Davison won his fourth and final AGP setting a record for wins that still stands today, having only been equalled by Michael Schumacher. David McKay actually crossed the finish line first but had been assigned a one-minute penalty, for a jumped start, which relegated him to third position behind Davison and Bib Stillwell.

Davison's Australian Grand Prix victory would be the last for a domestically based Australian until Frank Matich won the 1970 AGP at Warwick Farm in Sydney driving a McLaren M10B Formula 5000 car, although British-based Australian Jack Brabham had won the AGP in both 1963 and 1964.

Classification 

Results as follows.

Notes
 Pole Position: Bill Patterson - 1:42.0
 Fastest Lap: Bill Patterson / Lex Davison - 1:44.0

References

Grand Prix
Australian Grand Prix
Australian Grand Prix